Fraser Sweatman (October 14, 1913 – May 15, 1991) was a Canadian pair skater.  With partner Audrey Garland, he won the silver medal at the Canadian Figure Skating Championships in 1935 and competed in the 1936 Winter Olympics. He was born in Winnipeg, Manitoba.

Results
Pairs (with Garland)

References

Fraser Sweatman's profile at the Canadian Olympic Committee
Fraser Sweatman's obituary

1913 births
1991 deaths
Canadian male pair skaters
Figure skaters at the 1936 Winter Olympics
Olympic figure skaters of Canada
Sportspeople from Winnipeg